"Kilburn Towers" is a folk song by the Bee Gees. Written by Barry, Robin and Maurice Gibb in 1968 for the album Idea. It was also released as the B-side of "I Started a Joke" in most territories. This song's length was 2:14 in mono and 2:17 in stereo. The song was produced by the group's manager Robert Stigwood and the Bee Gees.
The song was written about the Sydney ocean apartment buildings, Kilburn Towers, built in 1960. (http://openjournal.com.au/iconic-sydney-apartment-buildings/)

Virginia Vee recorded "Kilburn Towers" in 1968.  Her version was released as a single only in France, with another Bee Gees song, "Let There Be Love", as the B-side; it was arranged by Jimi Horowitz and produced by Claude Ebrard on Polydor Records. Vee's version was recorded also at IBC Studios in London.

Writing and recording
Barry Gibb says that "Kilburn Towers" was written in his flat. Barry continues "I would just sit and strum on my own. I think it was just something that I sort of came up with and that was it."

It was recorded on 14 June 1968 with "Such a Shame". Barry performs vocals on this track. The breathy vocals and orchestral instrumental break are similar to "In the Summer of His Years". The flute sound throughout is performed by Maurice Gibb on Mellotron. Colin Petersen plays bongos on this track.

Personnel
Barry Gibb — lead vocals, acoustic guitar
Robin Gibb - harmony vocals
Maurice Gibb — mellotron, bass guitar, harmony vocals
Colin Petersen — bongos
 Bill Shepherd — orchestral arrangement

References

Bee Gees songs
Songs written by Barry Gibb
Songs written by Robin Gibb
Songs written by Maurice Gibb
Song recordings produced by Robert Stigwood
Song recordings produced by Barry Gibb
Song recordings produced by Robin Gibb
Song recordings produced by Maurice Gibb
British folk songs
1968 songs
1968 singles
Atco Records singles
Polydor Records singles